Sir Robert Arthur Owens  (26 August 1921 – 5 September 1999) was a New Zealand businessman and local politician. He served as mayor of both Tauranga and the nearby Mount Maunganui in the Bay of Plenty. He later moved from Mount Maunganui (which has the Port of Tauranga) to Auckland. He was knighted in 1997.

Biography
Owens was born in Manchester and educated at Manchester Grammar School and Liverpool Technical College. He was in the British merchant service from 1937 to 1946 when he arrived in New Zealand. He was chief officer holding a Master Mariner's Certificate and on Royal Navy transport tankers in the Mediterranean from 1942 to 1944.

He started his own shipping and stevedoring business in Tauranga in 1953. The Owens Group expanded into travel and insurance, covered 38 companies, and represented the Mitsui OSK Lines in New Zealand. The Owens Group was taken over by Mainfreight in 1993.

Owens was a Tauranga city councillor from 1962 to 1968, mayor of Tauranga from 1968 to 1977, and mayor of Mount Maunganui Borough from 1971 to 1974 (when he was defeated on the issue of amalgamation with Tauranga, which he favoured). He was on the Bay of Plenty Harbour Board from 1962 to 1988, director of the Port of Tauranga in 1988 and chairman of Air New Zealand from 1981 to 1984.

Personal life
Owens married Constance Joy Walker in Auckland in 1950, and they went on to have four children. Their grandchildren include rower Mahé Drysdale and field hockey player Rose Keddell. The couple later divorced and Owens married Ximena. He died in Auckland on 5 September 1999.

In the 2007 New Year Honours, Owens' first wife, Joy Owens, was appointed a Companion of the Queen's Service Order for community service. She died in 2016.

Honours
In the 1991 Queen's Birthday Honours, Owens was made a Commander of the Order of the British Empire, for services to transport industry, local government and community. In the 1997 Queen's Birthday Honours, he was appointed a Knight Companion of the New Zealand Order of Merit, for services to business and the community. In 1996, he was inducted into the New Zealand Business Hall of Fame.

References

1921 births
1999 deaths
20th-century New Zealand businesspeople
Tauranga City Councillors
Mayors of Tauranga
Businesspeople from Manchester
British emigrants to New Zealand
People educated at Manchester Grammar School
British Merchant Navy personnel of World War II
British Merchant Navy officers
New Zealand Commanders of the Order of the British Empire
Knights Companion of the New Zealand Order of Merit
20th-century New Zealand politicians
Businesspeople awarded knighthoods
20th-century English businesspeople